Pahvantia is an extinct genus of hurdiid radiodont from the Cambrian. It is known by a single species, Pahvantia hastata, described from Wheeler Shale and Marjum Formation in Utah. Although it was once considered as filter feeder using large number of putative setae, this structures are later considered as misidentification of trunk materials.

Description 
Genus name Pahvantia is named after Pahvant in western Utah. It was originally described as possible arthropod with unknown affinity. One specimen is described as a specimen of Proboscicaris agnosta, which is originally interpreted as bivalved arthropod, and now considered as head sclerites of Hurdia.

Similar to most of other hurdiid, Pahvantia had large dorsal head sclerite (H-element), and it was more than twice longer than wide. Based on frontal appendage, its morphology is most close to that of Hurdia, although shape of sclerites are enough different to consider Pahvantia as distinct genus.

Interpretation of frontal appendage 
Lerosey-Aubril and Pates (2018) considered fossil specimen KUMIP 314819 as frontal appendage with a multitude of long hair-like structures tentatively interpreted as setae hereafter. It was interpreted that frontal appendage had two different types of endites, two proximal short ones with robust plate-like structures with different widths, and five, apparently unpaired ones that are two to three times wider and around three times longer, with anterior margins that fringed by numerous setae. However, Moysiuk and Caron (2019) questioned this interpretation, with reasons such as unnatural fossil preservation against flexibility of structures, no differentiation between podomeres and endites that Lerosey-Aubril and Pates (2018) interpreted, too large frontal appendage size compared to other hurdiids. It was considered that whole morphology of "frontal appendage" shows several bands of lamellae and possibly represent disarticulated endites. Due to preservation status, researchers considered that morphology of frontal appendage is uncertain. In 2021, Moysiuk and Caron reinterpreted morphology of Pahvantia hastata with description of Titanokorys. Researchers compared the part and counterpart of specimen KUMIP 314819, and they found actual part shows Hurdia-like frontal appendage. "two proximal short endites with different widths" Lerosey-Aubril and Pates (2018) interpreted actually shows one endite and three overlapped endites. Other "five endites with numerous setae" are more comparable to gill blades (setal blades) on trunk segments.

Palaeoecology 
Pahvantia was originally interpreted as one of the examples of suspension feeding radiodont alongside Aegirocassis and Tamisiocaris, used numerous setae on frontal appendage to capture microscopic food particles suspended in the water column. However, after morphology of frontal appendage is reinterpreted, it is estimated that Pahvantia probably had nektobenthic lifestyle, captured larger prey living along or in the sediment, according to morphology of frontal appendage similar to Hurdia.

References 

Cambrian arthropods
Anomalocaridids
Fossil taxa described in 1981
Cambrian genus extinctions